Queen's Cross Church may refer to one of two Church of Scotland churches:

Queen's Cross Church, Aberdeen, consecrated in 1881
Queen's Cross Church, Glasgow, designed by Charles Rennie Mackintosh and consecrated in 1899

See also
Queen's Cross, an area in Aberdeen, Scotland